A Ship's Salute is a gesture or other action used to display respect. Salutes are primarily associated with armed forces, but other organisations and civil people also use salutes. Such a salute in terms of maritime connotations, usually involves the entering into, or retirement from, service, of civilian or military personnel; a vessel, or aircraft.

See also 
 Sail-by salute
 

Salutes
Naval ceremonies